Salem is a dispersed rural community and unincorporated place in the municipality of Arran–Elderslie, Bruce County in southwestern Ontario, Canada. The community is on Snake Creek, a tributary of the Saugeen River.

References

Communities in Bruce County